Capehart can refer to:

Persons 
 Charles E. Capehart
 Edward Capehart O'Kelley
 Harry J. Capehart (1881–1955), American lawyer, politician, and businessperson
 Henry Capehart
 Homer E. Capehart, U.S. Senator from Indiana (1945–63)
 James Capehart
 Jerry Capehart
 Jonathan Capehart, American journalist and television personality

Places 
 Capehart, Indiana
 Capehart, West Virginia
 Capehart House

other 
 Capehart, a luxury home radio-phonograph popular in the 1930s and 1940s.
 Capehart-Farnsworth, a luxury home television popular in the 1950s; often sold under the "Capehart" name.